This is a list of notable people from Restigouche County, New Brunswick. Although not everyone in this list was born in Restigouche County, they all live or have lived in Restigouche County and have had significant connections to the communities.

This article does not include people from Campbellton, as they have their own section.

See also
List of people from New Brunswick

References

Restigouche